The Free Democratic Serb Group, (Serbo-Croatian: Слободни демократски српски клуб/Slobodni demokratski srpski klub) is a parliamentary group in the National Assembly of Republika Srpska.

Formed in mid-2015 by deputies formerly affiliated to a number of different parties, it currently comprises three independent and one DNS deputy. It functions as a technical group of various deputies who are permitted to "be members of different political parties", whilst maintaining a "common political line".

Members

References

Political parties in Republika Srpska